Jug and Sonny is a compilation album by saxophonist Gene Ammons, with Sonny Stitt featured on two tracks, collecting recordings made between 1948 and 1951, some of which were originally released as singles, that was issued by the Chess label in 1960.

Track listing
All compositions by Gene Ammons except where noted:
 "Im's Not the Kind of Guy" (as "You're Not the Kind of a Girl") (Will Hudson) – 2:40
 "I Cover the Waterfront" (Johnny Green, Edward Heyman) – 2:37
 "Full Moon" – 2:40
 "Jam for Boppers" – 5:03
 "Don't Do Me Wrong" (Jimmy Mundy) – 2:47
 "Don't Worry About Me" (Rube Bloom, Ted Koehler) – 2:40
 "Baby, Won't You Please Say Yes"  (John Henry Burton as John Burton) – 2:44
 "Cha Bootie" (Jimmy Mundy) – 2:47
 "Tenor Eleven" – 2:50
 "The Last Chance" (as "The Last Mile") – 2:44
Recorded in Chicago on October 12, 1948 (track 4), January 8, 1950 (tracks 3, 8, 10), May 2, 1950 (track 9), August, 1950 (track 5) and May 3, 1951 (tracks 1, 2, 6, 7)

Personnel
Gene Ammons – tenor saxophone (tracks 1, 3 to 5, 7 to 10)
Sonny Stitt – tenor saxophone (tracks 2, 6), baritone saxophone (track 5)
Bill Massey (tracks 5, 9), Jesse Miller (tracks 3, 8, 10) – trumpet 
Matthew Gee – trombone (tracks 3, 5, 8 to 10)
Tom Archia – tenor saxophone (track 4)
Charlie Bateman (tracks 5, 9), Junior Mance (tracks 1, 3, 7, 8, 10 and probably 2, 6) – piano
Christine Chatman – piano (track 4)
Leo Blevins – guitar (tracks 3, 8, 10)
Leroy Jackson (tracks 3, 4, 8, 10), Gene Wright (tracks 1, 2, 5 to 7, 9) – bass
Wesley Landers (tracks 3 to 5, 8 to 10), Teddy Stewart (tracks 1, 2, 6, 7) – drums

References

Gene Ammons compilation albums
Sonny Stitt compilation albums
1960 compilation albums
Chess Records compilation albums